Sepiddasht (also Romanized as Sepīddasht and Sefīddasht) is a village in and coextensive with Fardis Rural District of the Central District of Fardis County, Alborz province, Iran. At the 2006 census, when it was a village in Karaj County, Tehran province, its population was 1,418 in 375 households. At the most recent census of 2016, its population was 3,338 people in 1,019 households.

References 

Fardis County

Populated places in Alborz Province

Populated places in Fardis County